The Big Valley is an American Western drama television series that originally aired from September 15, 1965, to May 19, 1969 on ABC. The series is set on the fictional Barkley Ranch in Stockton, California, from 1884 to 1888.  The one-hour episodes follow the lives of the Barkley family, one of the wealthiest and largest ranch-owning families in Stockton, led by matriarch Victoria Barkley (Barbara Stanwyck), her sons Jarrod (Richard Long) and Nick (Peter Breck), daughter Audra (Linda Evans), and their half-brother Heath (Lee Majors).  The series was created by A.I. Bezzerides and Louis F. Edelman, and produced by Levy-Gardner-Laven for Four Star Television.

Plot synopsis 
The series begins about 6 years after the death of the family patriarch, Thomas Barkley. Although he is never shown in the series (other than a painting and a statue), the character of Thomas Barkley is referred to as a major plot point many times.  The character of Heath Barkley is introduced in episode one as the illegitimate son of Tom Barkley. His presence and claim to the Barkley name is the focus of many of the dramatic plots in season one. While the successful and rich are often portrayed in present day as the unscrupulous villains, the Barkley family is portrayed as upstanding citizens of Stockton, models of justice and fairness, often going against popular sentiment to uphold the rights of the underdog.

Cast and characters

Main

Victoria Barkley, portrayed by Barbara Stanwyck, the widow of Thomas Barkley, was the head of the wealthy, influential Barkley family, who lived in 19th-century Stockton in California's Central Valley. She was the main character of the series. Victoria Barkley was the owner and head of the Barkley ranch. In fact, Stanwyck's refusal to portray Barkley as fragile was controversial at the time. Barkley's husband Tom had been killed 6 years before the beginning of the series. Victoria Barkley loved and was proud of all her children, including her late husband's illegitimate son Heath, to whom she would refer as "my son". Stanwyck, who went from the refined, elegant lady of the manor to a jean-clad cowgirl as tough as any cowboy, appeared the most, in 103 of the 112 episodes. Her episodes were often surprisingly hard-hitting, seeing her character either locked away in a lunatic asylum to prevent her testifying as eyewitness at a murder trial ("Down Shadow Street"), taken prisoner in a prison wagon to replace a dead female convict ("Four Days to Furnace Hill"), impersonating a thief to go undercover at a women's prison to report on conditions there ("Alias Nellie Handley"), or trapped underground following a cave-in ("Earthquake").
Jarrod Thomas Barkley, the eldest son, was a respected attorney-at-law. Richard Long played the role of the educated, refined, and calmest of the Barkley sons, who handled all of the family's legal and business affairs. While Jarrod, a skilled lawyer, preferred the law to settle disputes, he was known to resort to frontier justice and violence when necessary. He was briefly married in one episode ("Days of Wrath"), only to see his new wife murdered with a bullet intended for him. An enraged Jarrod lost his calm and genteel manners, then relentlessly tracked down the killer. He was in the midst of killing him with his bare hands before he was stopped by Nick and Heath. Jarrod was a veteran of the American Civil War. He served as a cavalry officer in the Union Army. He commanded a cavalry troop of black soldiers as referenced in the episode "The Buffalo Man". Long appeared in 98 of the 112 episodes.
Nicholas "Nick" Jonathan Barkley, the hot-tempered younger son, was portrayed by Peter Breck. Nick managed the family ranch. He wore a black leather vest, large black hat, and black leather gloves, and was distinguished by his brawling ways and loud demeanor. Nick had served as a soldier in combat in the Union Army during the Civil War as referenced in the episode "Forty Rifles". He was always ready for a fight, and at times would fight with his brothers, as well. Underneath his gruff exterior, he was fun-loving, had a great sense of humor, was warm and caring, and loved his family deeply. Breck appeared in 98 of the 112 episodes.(Several years prior to starring in The Big Valley, Breck starred in his own series for Four Star Television, Black Saddle, which aired on NBC).
Audra Barkley, played by Linda Evans, was Victoria's only daughter. Audra was somewhat self-absorbed, bold, and forward. Far from demure, she performed daring stunts and rode astride, like her brothers. Like Nick and Jarrod, Audra was initially leery of Heath's story that he was their father's son. Early, she attempted to seduce Heath, so as to expose him as a fraud, but was unsuccessful. As the series progressed, Audra and Heath formed a very close brother-and-sister bond. Audra also had a caring side, as seen by her tending to children at the local orphanage. A few episodes dealt with her romances, and one notable episode was "My Son, My Son" in which Robert Walker, Jr., guests as a suitor who proves to be mentally unstable. During the series' final two seasons, Evans' appearances were reduced because she wanted to spend more time with her husband John Derek. Evans appeared the least, in 82 of the 112 episodes.
Heath Barkley was the illegitimate son of Victoria's late husband, and he had to literally fight his way into the Barkley home. Lee Majors portrayed even-tempered but rough-and-tumble Heath, who was often angry and aggressive throughout the early episodes due to his belief that Tom Barkley had abandoned his real mother after she became pregnant, as well as the resistance he initially received from some of his new siblings. In truth, Tom Barkley never knew about Heath, as Heath's mother had never told him, and never told Heath until she was on her deathbed (as revealed in the third episode of season one, "Boots with My Father's Name".) Heath gradually gained acceptance from the rest of the Barkley clan as the first season progressed, until he became as much a "Barkley" as the rest of the family, and his love for them became equal. Heath came to call Victoria "Mother" when speaking to her directly and about her with his siblings. In the episode "Boots with My Father's Name", Heath told Victoria, "you know that there isn't anything that I wouldn't do for you," indicating how deeply he cared for Victoria. Although Nick was initially leery of Heath and felt he had to test Heath's mettle, Heath proved himself worthy of Nick's acceptance, and eventually Nick seemed to grow even closer to Heath than he was to Jarrod, perhaps in a sense due to Heath having more in common with him than did Jarrod. In "The Lost Treasure", the series' season-two premiere, one of a few episodes taken out of the show's initial syndication runs, Heath met Charlie Sawyer (comic Buddy Hackett in a rare dramatic turn), a con man who claimed to be his actual father (the final moments show him admitting he did romance Heath's mother, but left her years before she gave birth). In the same episode, Beah Richards returns as Hannah, the black quasinanny who helped raise Heath with his mother. Heath was a veteran of the Civil War as referenced in the episode "The Guilt of Matt Bentell". He served as a soldier in the Union Army in combat operations in New Mexico, and was held as a prisoner of war for 7 months by Confederate forces. Heath was also established in the episode "The Death Merchant" as having been involved in the Lincoln County War (1878), where he came to know the hired killer "Handy", who had tracked down and killed Tom Barkley's murderer, but who is known by Heath as a merciless killer who changed sides - or played both sides - whenever the money was good. Majors appeared in 97 of the 112 episodes.

In addition to the Barkley family members, the episode plots typically revolved around morally conflicted protagonists and antagonists, a common theme in the mythology of the American West in the 19th century.

Recurring
Silas (Napoleon Whiting), the Barkley's majordomo, appeared 35 times. In several episodes, his character showed the trauma of slavery ("Joshua Watson"), life for blacks after the Civil War ("The Buffalo Man"), and meaning in his own work for the family ("Miranda").
Sheriff Fred Madden (Douglas Kennedy) appeared in 20 episodes. 
Eugene Barkley (Charles Briles), the youngest Barkley son and a medical student studying at Berkeley. Like his older brothers, he was known to have a temper as seen in the season-one episode "Boots with My Father's Name". He appeared in eight first-season episodes. Then, he was drafted into the Army. Only once was his name ever mentioned again.

Guest Stars 
The Big Valley was well known for its many guest stars, including:

Julie Adams
Claude Akins
Jack Albertson
Chris Alcaide
Marty Allen
John Anderson
Richard Anderson
Tige Andrews
R. G. Armstrong
Lew Ayres
Diane Baker
Joe Don Baker
Rayford Barnes
Anne Baxter
Alan Bergmann
Milton Berle
Karen Black
Antoinette Bower
Charles Bronson
Brooke Bundy
Walter Burke
Michael Burns
Ellen Burstyn
Joseph Campanella
Judy Carne
John Carradine
Conlan Carter
Jeanne Cooper
Kelly Corcoran
Noreen Corcoran
Walter Coy
Yvonne Craig
Norma Crane
Johnny Crawford
Dennis Cross
Royal Dano
Clifford David
Quentin Dean
John Dehner
Bruce Dern
Colleen Dewhurst
Bradford Dillman
Richard Dreyfuss
Don Dubbins
Andrew Duggan
Maurice Evans
Richard Farnsworth
Paul Fix
Robert Fuller
Vincent Gardenia
Sean Garrison
Kathy Garver
Arlene Golonka
Harold Gould
Robert Goulet
Lee Grant
Dabbs Greer
James Gregory
Charles Grodin
Buddy Hackett
Kevin Hagen 
Julie Harris
Peter Haskell
Dennis Hopper
Ron Howard
Steve Ihnat
Anthony James
Russell Johnson
I. Stanford Jolley
Henry Jones
L. Q. Jones
Robert Karnes
Dan Kemp
George Kennedy
Sajid Khan
Yaphet Kotto
Diane Ladd
Martin Landau
Cloris Leachman
Robert Loggia
Julie London
Lynn Loring
Barbara Luna
Carol Lynley
Gavin MacLeod 
Mako
Flip Mark
Nora Marlowe
Frank Marth
Strother Martin
Marlyn Mason
Frank McGrath
John Milford
Read Morgan
Leslie Nielsen
Kathleen Nolan
Sheree North
Arthur O'Connell
Dan O'Herlihy
J. Pat O'Malley
Simon Oakland
Warren Oates
Susan Oliver
Nancy Olson
Gregg Palmer
Leslie Parrish
Nehemiah Persoff
Paul Petersen
Regis Philbin
John M. Pickard
Eve Plumb
Chips Rafferty
Ford Rainey
Lou Rawls
Beah Richards
Pernell Roberts
Wayne Rogers
Katharine Ross
Bing Russell
Jill St. John
Albert Salmi
Anne Seymour
William Shatner
David Sheiner
Olan Soule
Harry Dean Stanton
Warren Stevens
Harold J. Stone
Susan Strasberg
Karl Swenson
Dub Taylor
Malachi Throne
Harry Townes
Robert Walker Jr.
Fritz Weaver
Adam West
James Whitmore
Van Williams
Morgan Woodward
Anthony Zerbe

Episodes

Background and production

Background

The TV series was based loosely on the Hill Ranch, which was located at the western edge of Calaveras County, not far from Stockton. The Hill Ranch existed from 1855 until 1931 and included almost 30,000 acres, and the Mokelumne River ran through it. The source is from an episode in which Heath is on trial in a ghost town with another man (played by Leslie Nielsen), and tells the judge how much land they have. Lawson Hill ran the ranch until he was murdered in 1861. His wife Euphemia ("Auntie Hill") then became the matriarch. During their marriage, they had four children, one daughter and three sons. Today, the location of the ranch is covered by the waters of Camanche Reservoir. A California state historical marker standing at Camanche South Shore Park mentions the historic ranch.

In the first episode, titled "Palms of Glory", the grave of Thomas Barkley (1813–1870) is shown after  he is mentioned to have fought the railroad 6 years before. Later in the same episode, Frank Braun reminds Nick, Jarrod, and Eugene, "Six years ago, your daddy and mine fought and died for this," indicating the year is 1876. The episode "The Odyssey of Jubal Tanner" gives conflicting information. Audra states that her father died 6 years ago, which would—per "Palms of Glory"—point to 1876, but Jubal seems to imply that he has been gone 30 years since his wife Margaret Tanner's death, her grave marker showing that she had died in 1854, which would put the year around 1884. In the second-season episode "Hide the Children", Nick makes reference that President Ulysses Simpson Grant is in the White House. Grant's term of office was from March 4, 1869, to March 4, 1877. In the fourth- and final-season episode "They Called Her Delilah", the telegram Jarrod received from Julia Saxon dated April 27, 1878, can be seen on screen. In the fourth-season episode "The Prize", Heath buries the wife of an outlaw, adding a grave marker dated May 5, 1878. In the episode "The Jonah", the band at a town dance can be heard playing Johann Strauss II's "Emperor Waltz" or "Kaiser-Walzer". The waltz was first performed in Berlin on October 21, 1889, which, by the time it would have reached the American West, would indicate a time period of 1890 or later, much later than other historical references in the show.

Filming
While The Big Valley is set primarily in and near the city of Stockton, the filming of the series took place in Southern California. It was partially filmed in Wildwood Regional Park in Thousand Oaks, California.

Wilfred M. Cline, Technicolor associate cinematographer on Gone with the Wind (1939), was director of photography for several Big Valley episodes, together with Chas E. Burke. Nick's girlfriend in "The River Monarch" wears an open-weave/knit gray coat with red trim that was worn by Olivia de Havilland as Melanie Wilkes in the Atlanta train station Christmas scene in Gone With the Wind.

Music
The theme music was composed by George Duning, who also scored the pilot and four episodes; Lalo Schifrin, Elmer Bernstein, and Joseph Mullendore also scored episodes. Paul Henreid, of Casablanca fame, directed a number of episodes.

The series’ main title theme and primary incidental music were composed by George Duning and feature sweeping musical elements highly reminiscent of classic American cinematic Westerns. For at least the first pilot episode, the theme song starts with a more relaxed woodwinds introduction leading into the title refrain at a moderate tempo. For the remainder of season one, the tempo is increased and the intro is shortened, with much more aggressive phrasing.  For seasons three and four, the main theme was reworked again, with a much more brass-heavy orchestration.  The final refrain (when Miss Barbara Stanwyck's credits are shown), includes an underlying Spanish rhythm outlined with tambourine that is similar to that of The Magnificent Seven main title.  Therefore, at least three versions of the theme song were recorded for the series.

In 1966, a soundtrack album was released in both monoaural and stereo versions, featuring suites of various music cues from the series, re-recorded for the LP release (ABC-Paramount; ABC 527).  The album featured the iconic main theme song, but at slower tempos, giving them a more cinematic mood.  To date, the album has not been re-released on compact disc or streaming.  In 1980, the LP was reissued on vinyl on MCA Records for the Japanese market.

Re-recordings of the main theme song to The Big Valley have appeared on several Western movie-music compilation compact discs, and can currently be found on most music streaming services.

Reception

Popularity

Despite the series' popularity, its ratings never made the top 30 in the yearly ratings charts. The Big Valley was cancelled in 1969 as the TV Western craze began to fade, and to make room for more modern series. In Ella Smith's 1973 biography, Starring Miss Barbara Stanwyck, Smith noted that The Big Valley had been cancelled by ABC mainly due to a poor time slot. In better times, the series had been enough of a hit to outlive various time-slot rivals during its run (mainly on Mondays at 10 pm), including The Jean Arthur Show, Run for Your Life, and I Spy. According to Broadcasting magazine (September 27, 1965), its debut episode (actually Wednesday at 9 pm, where the series aired for half the season) placed 39th in the Nielsen ratings for the week of September 13–19, 1965.
 
The Big Valley also was ranked as one of the top-five favorite new shows in viewer TVQ polling (the others were Get Smart, I Dream of Jeannie, Lost in Space, and F Troop). Early into its second season, The Big Valley was still a mid-range performer, placing 47th out of just 88 series during the week of October 28, 1966, which was higher than such shows as That Girl, Daniel Boone, Petticoat Junction, and The Wild Wild West. Even so, The Big Valley was popular enough to warrant at least three TV Guide covers. It also acted as a launching pad for two projected spin-offs from special episodes. A 1968 episode guest-starring Van Williams was meant to lead to a Rifleman-like series titled Rimfire. A March 1969 episode, "The Royal Road", guest-starring heartthrob Sajid Khan as a young rogue, was also hoped to lead to a series, but by that year, the rising popularity of CBS's The Carol Burnett Show — and vocal complaints by Joey Bishop, ABC's late-night talk show host, that the show's faltering ratings were not helping to provide his program with a proper lead-in — ultimately led to the drama's demise. In syndication, The Big Valley proved exceptionally popular in the United States, Europe, and Latin America.
 
In the comedy film Airplane! (1980), the wacky air traffic controller Johnny, played by Stephen Stucker, paid homage to Big Valleys penchant for big drama in one of his many asides. After Lloyd Bridges' character frets about a pilot who cracked under pressure, Johnny says: "It happened to Barbara Stanwyck!" and "Nick, Heath, Jarrod – there's a fire in the barn!" The Big Valley also has seeped into the darker cinematic subconscious. In Bug, an acclaimed 2006 thriller starring Ashley Judd and Michael Shannon as drug addicts, their characters spiral into a hallucination that leads them to imagine tiny bugs have invaded their dwelling, with one referring to the little critters as "matriarchal aphids" that act "like Barbara Stanwyck in Big Valley."

Awards and nominations
In 1966, for her first season as Victoria Barkley, Barbara Stanwyck won the Emmy for lead actress in a drama series. She was nominated two more times (1967 and 1968) for her work in The Big Valley and earned three Golden Globe nominations as Best TV Star for the part, as well (1966, 1967, 1968). On March 15, 1967, Stanwyck was named favorite TV actress at the Photoplay magazine awards, which aired as a special episode of The Merv Griffin Show (David Janssen of The Fugitive was named favorite TV actor). Richard Long helped present Stanwyck her Gold Medal at the event.

The Big Valley was also recognized during its run for its polished production. In 1966 and 1968, the American Cinema Editors  named Valley the year's Best Edited Television Program (for the episodes "40 Rifles" and "Disappearance", respectively).

Adaptations

Comic book
Dell Comics published a short-lived comic book for six issues in 1966-69. (The last issue reprinted the first, and came out two years after issue #5).  All issues had photo covers.

Film
Film columnist Patrick Goldstein reported in the Los Angeles Times in July 2009 that filmmakers Daniel Adams and Kate Edelman Johnson were producing a feature-film version of The Big Valley with production to begin in April 2010 in New Mexico and Michigan. In 2012, the aforementioned film version of The Big Valley, which was to have first starred Susan Sarandon and then Jessica Lange in the role of Victoria Barkley, was put on hold indefinitely after the film's would-be director, Daniel Adams, was indicted for fraud pertaining to two previous films and sued by investors in "Valley" who claimed foul, as well.

Several episodes of the original TV series have been combined into concurrent-running feature-length TV movies, while the notable two-part episodes, "Legend of a General" and "Explosion!", have also been made into feature-length TV movies. These have been issued as TV movies on DVD as a box set, along with seasons one and two.

Home media
20th Century Fox Home Entertainment released the first season on DVD in Region 1 on May 16, 2006.  Season 2, Volume 1 was released on January 30, 2007.

On January 8, 2014,  Timeless Media Group announced it had acquired the rights to the series. They have subsequently released seasons 2 & 3 on DVD. The fourth and final season was released on October 28, 2014.

References

External links

 
 
 The Big Valley theme song at the Internet Archive

1965 American television series debuts
1969 American television series endings
Television series set in the 1880s
American Broadcasting Company original programming
Dell Comics titles
English-language television shows
Television shows adapted into comics
Television series by Four Star Television
Television series by 20th Century Fox Television
Television shows set in California
1960s Western (genre) television series
Television series based on actual events